Nazif Hajdarović (born 22 September 1984) is a Bosnian-Herzegovinian footballer who plays as a striker.

Club career
Hajdarović began his career with TuS Lappentasch Hof before joining SV Reiskirchen in 1995. In summer 2004, he left SV Reiskirchen and signed with 1. FC Saarbrücken, where he made his professional debut a year later, in a 3–1 defeat against Energie Cottbus in the 2. Bundesliga. He stayed with Saarbrücken through two relegations and the introduction of the new 3. Liga saw them drop to the fifth tier Oberliga Südwest, and helped them to begin their climb up the league, as they were Südwest champions in 2009.

He left 1. FC Saarbrücken on 30 June 2009 to join Bayern Munich II, signing a two-year contract. In his first season, he found opportunities limited, due in part to quotas of homegrown players placed on reserve teams – Hajdarovic found himself overlooked in favour of other senior players, such as Christian Saba and Danny Schwarz. Nonetheless, he managed a respectable return of four goals in thirteen appearances. The following season he made 30 appearances, mostly as a substitute, scoring twice, as the team were relegated from the 3. Liga. He signed for Hessen Kassel at the end of the season, but was released by the club in January 2012, at which point he returned to Saarland to sign for Borussia Neunkirchen. Six months later he moved again, to FK Pirmasens, where he spent one season before returning to Neunkirchen.

References

External links
 

1984 births
Living people
People from Gradiška, Bosnia and Herzegovina
Association football forwards
Bosnia and Herzegovina footballers
1. FC Saarbrücken players
FC Bayern Munich II players
KSV Hessen Kassel players
Borussia Neunkirchen players
FK Pirmasens players
FC Wiltz 71 players
2. Bundesliga players
Regionalliga players
Oberliga (football) players
3. Liga players
Luxembourg National Division players
Landesliga players
Bosnia and Herzegovina expatriate footballers
Expatriate footballers in Germany
Bosnia and Herzegovina expatriate sportspeople in Germany
Expatriate footballers in Luxembourg
Bosnia and Herzegovina expatriate sportspeople in Luxembourg